Walter Oswald Vizard (16 November 1861 – 10 January 1929) was an English cricketer.  Vizard was a right-handed batsman who fielded as a wicket-keeper.  He was born in Bellary, Madras Presidency in the British Raj (today India).  He was educated at Clifton College.

Vizard made his first-class debut for Gloucestershire against Middlesex in 1882.  He made seventeen further first-class appearances for the county, the last of which came against Surrey in 1890.  In his eighteen first-class matches, he scored 256 runs at an average of 8.53, with a high score of 49 not out.  Behind the stumps he made 11 catches and made a single stumping.

By 1891, Vizard had moved to Hertfordshire and was enlisted in the 1st (Hertfordshire) Volunteer Battalion, the Bedfordshire Regiment as a 2nd Lieutenant.  He held the rank of Lieutenant in 1895, in September of that year he was promoted to Captain.  By 1896, he was in partnership as a solicitor with a Charles Lothian Nicholson, son of General Lothian Nicholson, based in London, however in that year the partnership was dissolved by mutual consent.  He was also in partnership as a solicitor with a Lionel Monk Smith, but this partnership too was dissolved by mutual consent in 1897.  In 1897, he made a single appearance for Hertfordshire in the Minor Counties Championship against Norfolk.  By 1902, he was in partnership with a Henry Theodore Monro, but the partnership was dissolved by mutual consent in that year.

He died in Bayswater, London on 10 January 1929.

References

External links
Valter Vizard at ESPNcricinfo
Walter Vizard at CricketArchive

1861 births
1929 deaths
People from Bellary
People educated at Clifton College
English cricketers
Gloucestershire cricketers
Bedfordshire and Hertfordshire Regiment officers
Hertfordshire cricketers
English solicitors
Wicket-keepers
Military personnel of British India